Alfred Bailey may refer to:

Alfred Bailey (poet) (1905–1997), Canadian poet
Alfred Bailey (Australian cricketer) (born 1932), Australian cricketer
Alfred Bailey (English cricketer) (1871–1950), English cricketer
Alfred Bailey (trade unionist) (1828/9–1886), English trade union leader
Alfred Marshall Bailey (1894–1978), American ornithologist
Alfred James Bailey (1868–1948), British trade unionist and politician

See also
Alfred Bayly (1866–1907), New Zealand cricketer